Sijoy Varghese (born 6 March 1971) is an Indian actor and advertising filmmaker. He has been involved in advertising and cinema for 20 years. As an actor he has portrayed characters in Malayalam films including: Bangalore Days, Avatharam, James & Alice, Aadhi and Ittymaani: Made in China.

Early life
He was born in Edappally, Kochi to (Late) C. Varghese Kelamparambil (Rtd Headmaster) and (Late) Leelamma Varghese (Teacher). He studied at the Sacred Heart College, Thevara before commencing his career in the film and Ad film industry. He married Tessy Raphel in 1999. The couple has five children — Varkey, Maria, Anna, Anthony & Zarah.

Career
A career that started off as a young Asst Director, Sijoy has been fortunate to have worked with leading Ad film production houses of India. In 2005 he found his own production house "TVC Factory", which has now grown to secure the privilege of being one of the most trusted production houses in India and UAE. Sijoy Varghese is also an actor who has performed supporting characters in Malayalam films like Bangalore Days, Avatharam, James & Alice, Aadhi & Itty Maani Made In China.
And, He is the current General Secretary of Indian Adfilm Makers (IAM), Kerala Chapter.

Film
He started his acting career in 2013 with the role of a Police commissioner in Martin Prakkat's ABCD along with Dulquer Salmaan. He indulged in further experimentation with Amal Neerad Production's 5 Sundarikal(2013). He wrote ‘Isha’ with the co-writer Sidharth Bharathan for Sameer Thahir in the much appreciated anthology. After his villainous Cabinet Minister for Thira by Vineeth Sreenivasan, he did a well notable role in Anjali Menon's movie Bangalore Days as Coach Zach, for which his character got huge fan flowing. Later, he did the same role of the coach to Arya in the Tamil remake named Bangalore Naatkal. Then he appeared on screen as ACP Gautam Viswanath along with Dileep in director Joshiy's Avatharam for which his character got appreciation by critics and public in general. In 2016 he portrayed St. Peter in Sujith Vasudev's debut movie James & Alice, for which he garnered critical acclaim for his style of acting. His characters in Jamna Pyari as Vasu, Pranav Mohanlal starer Aadhi as Sidharth, Mohanlal starer Ittymaani: Made in China as Alex Plamoottil, were also made a remarkable appearance in those movies.

Filmography

References

External links
 

Living people
Indian male film actors
Male actors in Malayalam cinema
Male actors in Tamil cinema
Male actors from Kerala
Tamil male actors
21st-century Indian male actors
1975 births